Pythium paddicum is a plant pathogen infecting barley.

References

External links
 Index Fungorum
 USDA ARS Fungal Database

Water mould plant pathogens and diseases
paddicum